Paul Mazzolini (born 18 February 1960), known by his stage name Gazebo, is an Italian singer, songwriter, musician and record producer best known for his italo disco music style during the 1980s. His song "I Like Chopin" reached No. 1 in more than 15 countries, and his debut single "Masterpiece" was also an international success.

Early life 

Mazzolini was born in Beirut, Lebanon, where his father was working as a diplomat in the Italian embassy. Through his father's work, he later lived in Jordan, Denmark (where he learned English at an American school) and France. He also worked as a guitarist in London for some time. He finished his university study of French literature with a degree in 1983. He chose his stage name 'Gazebo' after the pavillon structure of the same name, because it sounded catchy and this was important for radio DJs at the time.

Career 

In 1983 he released "I Like Chopin".  It sold 8 million copies worldwide and reached No. 1 of Italian charts along with 15 other countries, among them Germany, Spain and Austria. His singles "Masterpiece" (1982) and "Lunatic" (1983) also reached Top Ten in several European, Asian and Latin American countries. His work in that period was produced by Pierluigi Giombini with whom he co-wrote the hit "Dolce Vita" for singer Ryan Paris.

Mazzolini is still touring and working on new albums. In addition, he is also working as a producer for other artists. In 2014 he acted in the film-comedy Sexy Shop.

Discography

Albums

Studio albums

Live albums

Remix albums

Compilation albums

Singles

References

External links 

 
 
 
 

1960 births
Living people
20th-century Italian composers
20th-century Italian male singers
21st-century Italian composers
21st-century Italian male singers
English-language singers from Italy
Italian electronic musicians
Italian Italo disco musicians
Italian male singers
Italian male singer-songwriters
Italian multi-instrumentalists
Italian people of American descent
Italian pop singers
Italian record producers
Musicians from Beirut
Singers from Beirut